Richard Thomas Pitman (born 21 January 1943) is a retired British jump jockey who rode 427 winners in his career, including Lanzarote in the 1974 Champion Hurdle. He won the King George VI Chase at Kempton Park Racecourse twice, the Whitbread Gold Cup once and the Hennessy Gold Cup once.

Pitman is also remembered for coming a close second in the 1973 Grand National on Crisp to Red Rum ridden by Brian Fletcher.

He joined the BBC TV racing team in 1975. As an author he has written seven racing novels and five non-fiction books. He was married to Jenny Pitman; they divorced in 1977. Their son, Mark Pitman, was also a jockey - his most notable success being a famous victory in the 1991 Cheltenham Gold Cup on Garrison Savannah, a horse trained by Jenny Pitman.  Mark became a trainer in his own right upon his retirement.

Bibliography
Pitman has written many books on the subject of horse racing. All have been co-authored with Joe McNally apart from Fit for a Queen and Good Horses Make Good Jockeys, including:

 Warned Off (The Eddie Malloy Series Book 1) 
 Hunted (The Eddie Malloy Series Book 2) 
 Blood Ties (The Eddie Malloy Series Book 3) 
 Running Scared (The Eddie Malloy Series Book 4) 
 The Third Degree (The Eddie Malloy Series Book 5) 
 Bet Your Life 
 Joseph’s Mansions

External links
Grand National guide by Pitman on BBC Online

Living people
English jockeys
British horse racing writers and broadcasters
BBC sports presenters and reporters
1943 births